Henry P. Scott was a grocer, farmer, sheriff, tax collector, and  state legislator in Mississippi.

He was born in Mississippi and enslaved at birth. He was a delegate to the 1865 Mississippi black convention at Vicksburg. He was elected to represent Issaquena County in the Mississippi House of Representatives in 1877.

Records vary on his birth year.

See also
African-American officeholders during and following the Reconstruction era

References

Members of the Mississippi House of Representatives
Year of birth missing
Year of death missing